Kuwaiti cuisine is a fusion of Arabian, Iranian, Indian and  Mediterranean cuisines. Kuwaiti cuisine is part of the Eastern Arabian cuisine. A prominent dish in Kuwaiti cuisine is machboos, a rice-based dish usually prepared with basmati rice seasoned with spices, and chicken or mutton.

Seafood is a significant part of the Kuwaiti diet, especially fish. Mutabbaq samak is a national dish in Kuwait. Other local favourites are hamour (grouper), which is typically served grilled, fried, or with biryani rice because of its texture and taste; safi (rabbitfish); maid (mulletfish); and sobaity (sea bream).

Kuwait's traditional flatbread is called Iranian khubz. It is a large flatbread baked in a special oven and it is often topped with sesame seeds. Numerous local bakeries dot the country; the bakers are mainly Iranians (hence the name of the bread, "Iranian khubuz"). Bread is often served with mahyawa fish sauce.

There are many other cuisines available due to the international workforce in Kuwait.

Dishes

 Biryani – a very common dish, which consists of heavily seasoned rice cooked with chicken or lamb. Originally from the Indian sub-continent.
 Gabout, – stuffed flour dumplings in a thick meat stew.
 Harees – wheat cooked with meat then mashed, usually topped with cinnamon sugar.
 Jireesh (Yireesh) – a mash of cooked spelt with chicken or lamb, tomatoes, and some spices.
 Machboos – a dish made with mutton, chicken, or fish accompanied over fragrant rice that has been cooked in chicken/mutton well-spiced broth.
 Mashkhool – white rice and at the bottom of the pot, there are rings of onion with turmeric and black pepper. and sometimes potatoes and eggplants are also added at the bottom of the pot.
 mashwi jeder  – white rice with beef or chicken, onions, potatoes and spices all at the bottom of the pot and then flipped upside down on a plate.  
Maidem (Arabic: ميدم) – a white rice and on top of it ground fish mixed with spices. 
 Marabyan – a rice cooked with either fresh or dry shrimp.
 Maglooba – rice cooked with meat and potatoes and eggplant.
 Margoog – vegetable stew, usually containing squash and eggplant, cooked with thin pieces of rolled out dough.
 Mumawwash – rice cooked with green lentils and can be topped with dry shrimp.
 Muaddas – rice cooked with red lentils and can be topped with dry shrimp.
 Mutabbaq samak – fish served over rice. Rice is cooked in well-spiced fish stock.
 Quzi – roasted lamb stuffed with rice, meat, eggs, and other ingredients.

Sauces and soups

  Daqqus – Type of tomato sauce served alongside rice
 Mabboj – It is hot sauce, red or green pepper mixed with other ingredients.
 Mahyawa – a tangy fish sauce.
  Marrag – It is a type of broth with tomato paste and a variety of vegetables and spices.
 Lentil soup

 Desserts 
   Asida – a dish made up of cooked wheat flour, with added butter or honey.
 Balaleet – sweet saffron noodles served with a savoury omelette on top.
 Bayth elgitta – a fried cookie filled with a mixture of ground nuts and tossed in powdered sugar. It was named after the egg of the crowned sandgrouse (common to the area) due to its similar shape.
 Darabeel – made from flour, eggs, milk and sugar formed into very thin rolled layers. Sometimes sugar, cardamom or cinnamon are added. 
 Lugaimat – fried yeast dumplings topped with sugar syrup (sugar, saffron).
 Gers ogaily – a traditional cake made with eggs, flour, sugar, cardamom, and saffron. Traditionally served with tea.
 Zalabia – fried dough soaked in syrup (sugar, lemon, and saffron, it has a distinctive swirly shape.
 Ghraiba – Delicate cookies made of flour, butter, powdered sugar and cardamom. Usually served with Arabic coffee.
 Khabeesa – sweet dish made of flour and oil.
   Sab Alqafsha (Kuwaiti Arabic: صب القفشة) –  similar to lugaimat but with additional saffron and cardamom syrup.
   Elba – Kuwaiti milk pudding with saffron and cardamom.

 maghuta (Kuwaiti Arabic: ماغوطة)- It's a type of pudding that contains coconut shell powder Sago instead of starch made with saffron.

Beverages
 Laban (yogurt milk)
 Sharbat baithan
 Black tea served in delicate cups called istikana''
 Arabic coffee
 Kuwaiti tea
 Dried lime tea
 Karak tea
 Different varieties of Arabic tea

See also

 Culture of Kuwait
 Arab cuisine

References

Bibliography
 Al-Hamad, Sarah, 2015, Cardamom and Lime: Tastes of the Arabian Gulf , Fox Chapel Publishing, 
 DiPiazza, Francesca Davis, 2006 Kuwait in Pictures, Twenty-First Century Books, p. 56- 57, 
 Riolo, Amy, 2007, Arabian Delights: Recipes & Princely Entertaining Ideas from the Arabian Peninsula, Capital Books, p. 23- 24,

Further reading
 O'Shea, Maria, 1999, Kuwait, Marshall Cavendish p. 114- 121, 

 
Middle Eastern cuisine
Arab cuisine